Ronaldo Henrique Silva (born 10 April 1991), simply known as Ronaldo, is a Brazilian professional footballer who plays as a forward for Malaysia Super League club Negeri Sembilan.

Playing career

Yokohama FC
Ronaldo played for J2 League club Yokohama FC in the 2014 season, we he was rewarded with free tyres instead of a salary.

Perak FA
Ronaldo played for Malaysia Super League club Perak FA in the 2019 season. He scored 2 goals in his debut against PKNP FC in the 2019 Malaysia FA Cup Quarterfinal 2nd Leg. Perak won the game 2–1. Three days later, he scored again in his first game in the league against the same team, PKNP FC. The match ended 3–1 in favour of Perak.

Career statistics

References

External links

1991 births
Living people
Brazilian footballers
Association football forwards
J2 League players
Yokohama FC players
Perak F.C. players
Brazilian expatriate footballers
Expatriate footballers in Malaysia
Associação Portuguesa de Desportos players
Guarani FC players
Joinville Esporte Clube players
Ituano FC players
Botafogo de Futebol e Regatas players
Esporte Clube São Bento players
Botafogo Futebol Clube (SP) players
Avaí FC players
Esporte Clube XV de Novembro (Piracicaba) players
Fortaleza Esporte Clube players
Sport Club do Recife players
Associação Atlética Internacional (Limeira) players
Esporte Clube Santo André players
People from São Bernardo do Campo
Footballers from São Paulo (state)